Cecelia González is an American politician serving as a member of the Nevada Assembly from the 16th district. González was elected to the Nevada Assembly in 2020.

She attended the University of Nevada, and was a member of Delta Tau Lambda.

References

1991 births
Living people
Democratic Party members of the Nevada Assembly
Hispanic and Latino American state legislators in Nevada
Hispanic and Latino American women in politics
University of Nevada, Las Vegas alumni
21st-century American politicians
21st-century American women politicians